Čistá may refer to places in the Czech Republic:

Čistá (Mladá Boleslav District), a municipality and village in the Central Bohemian Region
Čistá (Rakovník District), a municipality and village in the Central Bohemian Region
Čistá (Svitavy District), a municipality and village in the Pardubice Region
Čistá u Horek, a municipality and village in the Liberec Region